Claire de Lorez (August 12, 1895 – September 21, 1985) was an American film actress of the silent era.

Partial filmography

 The Scuttlers (1920)
 The Four Horsemen of the Apocalypse (1921)
 The Queen of Sheba (1921)
 Enemies of Women (1923)
 Bright Lights of Broadway (1923)
 Three Weeks (1924)
 Beau Brummel (1924)
 The Siren of Seville (1924)
 Her Night of Romance (1924)
 So This Is Marriage (1924)
 The Re-Creation of Brian Kent (1925)
 The Coast Patrol (1925)
 Under the Rouge (1925)
 Northern Code (1925)
 Cobra (1925)
 The Crew (1928)
 Morgane, the Enchantress (1928)

References

Bibliography
 Goble, Alan. The Complete Index to Literary Sources in Film. Walter de Gruyter, 1999.

External links

1895 births
1985 deaths
American film actresses
American silent film actresses
20th-century American actresses
Actresses from San Francisco